The National Apprenticeship Service (NAS), part of the Education and Skills Funding Agency, is a government agency that coordinates apprenticeships in England, enabling young people to enter the skilled trades.

History
At the beginning of February 2008 the Labour Government published a document called Strategy for the Future of Apprenticeships in England. It introduced a quango, the National Apprenticeship Service (NAS). The National Skills Director of the Learning and Skills Council (LSC) was to be in charge of the NAS. The LSC at the time had had most of its funding farmed out to local authorities. The NAS was to be part of the LSC, as outlined in the government's 2008 document on apprenticeships. Two new divisions in the LSC were formed at the same time - one for young people headed by Rob Wye, and one for adult education and training headed by Chris Roberts. All of the three new divisions were still at this stage part of the LSC, and not separate entities. At the time six government agencies had some responsibility for apprenticeships, but there was no overall leadership.

At the time of its formation, the Labour Government up to that point had been heavily focused on persuading 50% of under-18s to attend university. In other European countries, much more focus is placed on apprenticeships; only 6% of English companies offer apprenticeships compared to 30% in Germany. In England, those who by age of 25 had been on an apprenticeship are likely to earn much more than those who do not, for similar qualifications (£100,000 over a career). A university degree is often quoted as improving earning potential, but is highly dependent on choice of degree, and apprenticeships have a much higher success rate on earning potential.

See also
Apprenticeships in the United Kingdom
T Level

References

External links
 National Apprenticeship Service
 Twitter

Education in England
Vocational education in the United Kingdom
Public bodies and task forces of the United Kingdom government
Organisations based in Coventry
Government agencies established in 2009
Funding bodies of England
Further education colleges in England
Department for Education
Department for Business, Innovation and Skills
Apprenticeship